The 2012 Indoor Football League season was the fourth season of the Indoor Football League (IFL). The league lost nine of its previous teams but gained three new teams. The three new teams were the Cedar Rapids Titans, New Mexico Stars and the Everett Raptors. The season kicked off on February 19, 2012, when the Chicago Slaughter beat the Bloomington Edge 50–34. For the 2012 season, the IFL switched to a two-conference format with no divisions, due, in large part, to the loss of all the Texas-based teams (except the Allen Wranglers) to the newly formed Lone Star Football League. The Wranglers brought attention to the league for offering a US$500,000 contract to unemployed wide receiver Terrell Owens to become the team's part-owner and wide receiver. Owens accepted the contract. ESPN3 carried Owens's debut game against the Wichita Wild. The front office of the league saw changes as well, as Commissioner Tommy Benizio resigned. The league appointed assistant commissioner Robert Loving as the interim Commissioner.

Standings

Playoffs

Awards

Individual season awards

1st Team All-IFL

2nd Team All-IFL

References